Waugoshance Island is an island off of Waugoshance Point, in Lake Michigan. It is located in Bliss Township of Emmet County, Michigan. Waugoshance and nearby Temperance Island are part of the Wilderness State Park. The Waugoshance Light is located north west of the island in shallow water shoals, that prove to be challenging for navigation.  The White Shoal Light and the Grays Reef Light are also in the waters near the island.

Climate

References

Islands of Lake Michigan in Michigan